Paediatric radiology (or pediatric radiology) is a subspecialty of radiology involving the imaging of fetuses, infants, children, adolescents and young adults. Many paediatric radiologists practice at children's hospitals.

Although some diseases seen in paediatrics are the same as that in adults, there are many conditions which are seen only in infants. The specialty has to take in account the dynamics of a growing body, from pre-term infants to large adolescents, where the organs follow growth patterns and phases. These require specialised imaging and treatment which is carried out in a Children's hospital, which has all the facilities necessary to treat children and their specific pathologies.

Environment
To successfully diagnose a paediatric condition, high-quality images are needed to give a diagnosis. To achieve this requires creating an environment where a child is comfortable. This is one of the most essential elements to paediatric radiology. For imaging departments which specialise in paediatric radiology, this is very easy as rooms can be tailored to suit a child's needs.  For example, bright wall designs, visual stimulation and toys. These can be permanent fixtures as the department wouldn't need to cater to any other age range. For departments which only see children occasionally, creating a 'child friendly' environment is more difficult. It is usually achieved by creating one room a 'child friendly room' where murals / stencils can be painted on the wall. Modern children's hospitals are now designed with much glass to allow as much natural light in as possible, the Evelina Children's Hospital being one of these.

Challenges
Paediatric radiology comes with many challenges. Unlike adults, children cannot always understand / comprehend a change of environment. Therefore, staff are usually required to wear colourful uniforms, usually 'scrubs', as opposed to a normal hospital uniform. It is also important to recognise that when a child is unwell, they follow their instincts, which is usually to cry and stay close to their parents. This presents a huge challenge for the radiographer, who must try to gain the child's trust and gain their co-operation. Once co-operation has been achieved there is another big challenge of keeping the child still for their imaging test. This can be very difficult for children in a lot of pain. Coercion and support from parents is usually enough to achieve this, however, in some extreme cases (such as MRI and CT), it may be necessary to sedate the child.

Another challenge faced is the radiation difference between an adult and child.

Medical Use of Radiation: Medicine has used ionizing radiation for decades to help diagnose or treat children (and adults). There is no doubt that this imaging has saved lives. Medical imaging use has grown exponentially in the past few years, particularly the use of CAT Scans (also called CT scans). There are approximately 65 million CT scans done in the United States annually with an estimated 8 million in children. However, there is a much higher radiation dose from CT scans than from the traditional radiographs and fluoroscopy tests that radiologists perform and interpret. CT scans provide in general more information about the anatomy and diseases in the body but could be replaced for some orthopedic indications by other low-dose imaging modalities like EOS. To do this, though, they may expose a person to 100 to 250 times the radiation dose compared to a chest x-ray.

Radiation Safety Issues: There are risks from ionizing radiation that are comprehensively studied in the survivors of the atomic bomb in Hiroshima in 1945. Longitudinal studies led by the National Academy of Sciences in the United States have shown increased cancer rates in this population that are dose dependent. From these data, modelling research suggests that even at the lower doses used in medical imaging, there may be an added risk of cancer. Last year, two medical physicists suggested that the increasing use of CAT Scans in the United States may increase cancer incidence in the future.

Paediatric Radiation Protection Issues: Children are more radiosensitive than adults. They also have a longer life expectancy over which they may develop cancer from exposures to ionizing radiation. The paediatric radiology and medical community has long had an awareness of this issue and has developed radiation protection policies and practices that reflect this. With the increased use of imaging and in particular, CT scanning, there is increasing attention to this issue by the entire medical and radiology communities. An educational resource for health care providers as well as patients and parents is the Image Gently web site started in 2008. There is collaboration by several radiology, medical physics, paediatrics, and governmental organizations to increase awareness of radiation safety issues in children and to provide education to all stakeholders caring for children on ways to decrease the ionizing radiation exposure in children . For parents, basic information brochures that can be printed or downloaded that describe what an X ray is, what are its risks and benefits, and what can be done to decrease these risks . A call to action has been published advocating a reduction of ionizing radiation exposure to children by delivering the right imaging exam, the right way with the right dose.

Equipment
Equipment adapted for use in paediatric radiology includes:

Artificial Windows / light panels
Positioning equipment such as constraints, sponges and weights.
Example constraint devices for X-Rays are Pigg-O-Stat baby tubes.

Most equipment is the same used for adult imaging, but using lower dose and exposure setting adapted for children.

Paediatric radiology training
In many countries, paediatric radiology does not officially require a specific training. Where there is, paediatric radiologists have usually completed a diagnostic radiology residency, then complete one or two more years of subspecialty fellowship training before they are eligible to take the board examination for official subspecialty certification (e.g. Canada, UK, Switzerland). This then qualifies them in the specialised area of paediatric radiology.

Common paediatric pathologies requiring imaging
Wilms' tumour
Leukaemia
Teratoma
Congenital abnormalities
Osteosarcoma
Meningitis
Infant respiratory distress syndrome
Juvenile idiopathic arthritis
Greenstick fractures

See also
 Radiology
 Paediatrics
 Medical imaging
 EOS (medical imaging)

References

External links
Royal College of Paediatrics and Child Health

Radiology